Caged is a 1950 American women-in-prison film noir directed by John Cromwell and starring Eleanor Parker, Agnes Moorehead, Betty Garde, Hope Emerson, and Ellen Corby. It was nominated for three Academy Awards.

The film portrays the story of a young newlywed sent to prison for armed robbery. Her brutal experiences while incarcerated, along with the killing of her husband, transform her from a meek, naive woman into a hardened convict. The film's subplot includes massive prison corruption.

Caged was adapted by Virginia Kellogg from the story "Women Without Men" by Kellogg and Bernard C. Schoenfeld. The studio had originally intended the film to be a vehicle for Bette Davis and Joan Crawford, but reportedly Davis had said she did not want to make a "dyke movie" (a film with lesbian content) and turned it down.

Plot
A married 19-year-old, Marie Allen (Eleanor Parker), is sent to prison after a botched armed robbery attempt with her husband, Tom, who is killed. While receiving her initial prison physical examination, she learns that she is two months pregnant.

Marie has trouble adjusting to the monotonous and cut-throat world of the women's prison. She meets Kitty Stark (Betty Garde), a murderous shoplifter, who says once Marie gets out, Kitty will get her a job "boosting" (shoplifting). Marie does not want to get involved in crime, but Kitty explains the realities of prison life; "You get tough or you get killed. You better wise up before it's too late."

Told she can be paroled in ten months, Marie witnesses prisoner after prisoner being "flopped back"—granted parole—but then not released from jail because no job had been arranged by her parole officer. One flopped-back prisoner, June (Olive Deering), hangs herself given the hopelessness of her situation. For Marie, this steadily drains her own hopes of getting out early.

Despite the hardships under sadistic matron Evelyn Harper (Hope Emerson), Marie gives birth to a healthy but premature baby. She plans to "temporarily" grant full custody to her mother, with the intent of getting the child back after she is released, but Marie's stepfather had already decided not to allow the baby into his house. Marie's mother uses the excuses that she is "too old" and "hasn't a penny in [her] name" as reasons why she cannot help Marie. After Marie is denied a parole, she tries half-heartedly to escape. She is not punished for that attempt, although prison authorities do force her to give up her child for adoption.

The arrival of "vice queen" Elvira Powell (Lee Patrick) sets off a rivalry with Kitty. Elvira bribes Harper to put Kitty in solitary confinement, where Kitty is beaten. When a kitten is found in the jail yard, Marie attempts to make it a pet, but Harper tries to take the little animal away, an action that prompts the inmates to riot. The kitten is accidentally killed during the melee; and after order is restored by the staff, Marie is punished this time for trying to escape again by being sent to solitary confinement.

Before taking Marie to an isolated cell, Harper shaves Marie's head, symbolically stripping her of her innocence. Harper has disagreements with the sympathetic reformist prison superintendent, Ruth Benton (Agnes Moorehead), especially after this latest incident with Marie. Because Harper is a political appointee, the police commissioner refuses to fire her and instead asks for Benton's resignation. When Benton declares that she will demand a public hearing, the resignation issue is dropped.

Kitty finally rejoins her fellow inmates after serving a month in solitary confinement, but she is distraught and mentally unstable. After being harassed by Harper in the prison cafeteria, Kitty stabs Harper to death as the inmates watch and make no attempt to stop it. Marie—now hardened by her exposure to career criminals and sadistic guards—actually encourages Kitty in the fatal assault.

Up for parole once again, Marie has allegedly found a "cashier's job" outside the prison. In reality, the job is simply a ruse to get released so she can join Elvira Powell's shoplifting gang. Marie leaves the institution a cynical, unscrupulous woman after living and surviving there for over a year. Before she departs, Benton asks her why she is going into crime when she could go get a legitimate job. Marie says she got all the education she needed in prison. After she leaves, an office assistant asks Benton what to do with Marie's file. Benton replies, "Keep it active, she'll be back."

Cast

 Eleanor Parker - Marie Allen
 Agnes Moorehead - Ruth Benton
 Ellen Corby - Emma Barber
 Hope Emerson - Evelyn Harper
 Betty Garde - Kitty Stark
 Sheila MacRae - Helen

 Jan Sterling - Jeta Kovsky aka "Smoochie"
 Lee Patrick - Elvira Powell
 Jane Darwell - Solitary Confinement Matron
 Gertrude W. Hoffmann - Millie
 Olive Deering - June Roberts
 Gertrude Michael - Georgia Harrison

Critical reception
In 1950, Variety gave a mixed but predominantly positive review of Caged. The film industry's long-established, widely read trade paper believed the film might struggle in the "general market", characterizing it as a "grim, unrelieved study of cause and effect" that "still adds up to very drab entertainment". Nevertheless, Variety was very complimentary of nearly all aspects of the film's production, including its direction, editing, set designs, music, and cast performances, especially those of Parker and Emerson:

Another American reviewer in 1950, Film Bulletin, gave generally high marks as well to Caged. The New York-based weekly publication, which promoted itself as an “Independent Motion Picture Trade Paper”, did contend that the film's "stark, gripping" social commentary would be even more powerful if the "dismal atmosphere" of its storyline had at least a few contrasting lighter moments. “'Caged’”, Film Bulletin observed, "is to penal institutions what ‘The Snake Pit’ was to mental institutions and ‘The Lost Weekend’ to alcoholism."

In a much later review, critic Emanuel Levy in 2007 generally praised the film too:

Leonard Maltin's Movie Guide in 2014 favorably awarded Caged three out of four stars, also describing the film overall as “stark” with "remarkable" performances.

Accolades

In popular culture
Caged is satirized in a 1977 SCTV comedy sketch as "Broads Behind Bars" with the character of Marie renamed "Cheryl" (and portrayed by comedian Catherine O'Hara). Cheryl is depicted as a teenager in the mid-to-late 1950s, who after smoking "pot" ends up in prison after being framed for armed robbery and also learns later that she is pregnant. The character of Kitty is played by Andrea Martin, while John Candy, in drag, plays the role of matron Harper (called "Schultzy"). A knife fight between Kitty and Harper occurs in the skit, instead of a fork as in the film, although both Kitty and Schultzy die. Kitty is fatally stabbed by Schultzy, and Schultzy is later killed by Cheryl. For her action, Cheryl is then told she can be released from prison, however, she responds by only laughing and declining the offer, echoing Kitty's remark in the original film, “No dice!” The skit, in the end, presents itself not only as a parody of “women-in-prison” movies like Caged but also as a spoof of the anti-marijuana films that were presented to students in many American high schools during the late 1950s and early 1960s.

References

Sources

External links

Streaming audio
 Eleanor Parker also stars in the radio version of Caged, which was originally broadcast eight months after the film's release. It was presented by NBC Radio on August 2, 1951, as episode #112 of the network's anthology series Screen Directors Playhouse. That adaptation is free for download at the Internet Archive.

1950 films
1950 drama films
1950s prison films
American black-and-white films
American prison drama films
1950s English-language films
Film noir
Films directed by John Cromwell
Films scored by Max Steiner
Warner Bros. films
Women in prison films
1950s American films